Bibi Pur is a village and in Fatehpur tehsil of Sikar District in the Rajasthan, India.

It is located at 30°54'41N 73°28'20E and has an altitude of 159 metres (541 feet).

References

Union councils of Okara District
Villages in Okara District